CJMD-FM is a Canadian radio station, broadcasting a French-language community radio format on the frequency 96.9 FM in Lévis, Quebec.

Owned by Radio communautaire de Lévis, the station received CRTC approval on September 4, 2009.

The station is a member of the Association des radiodiffuseurs communautaires du Québec.

References

External links
969fm.ca - CJMD-FM
TuneIn: CJMD FM 96,9 LÉVIS
 

JMD
JMD
JMD
Lévis, Quebec
Radio stations established in 2009
2009 establishments in Quebec